The Satinay sand skink (Coggeria naufragus), also known commonly as the  Fraser Island sand skink, is a species of lizard in the family Scincidae. The species is native to Australia.

Taxonomy
C. naufragus is the type species of the monotypic genus Coggeria.

Etymology
The generic name, Coggeria, is in honor of Australian herpetologist Harold Cogger.

The specific name, naufragus, means "shipwrecked" or "castaway" in Latin.

Geographic range
C. naufragus is endemic to Fraser Island, Queensland, Australia.

Habitat
The preferred natural habitat of C. naufragus is forest.

Description
C. naufragus has an elongated body and very small legs. There are three digits on each front foot, and three digits on each hind foot.

Behavior
C. naufragus is terrestrial and fossorial.

Reproduction
The mode of reproduction of C. naufragus is unknown.

References

Further reading
Cogger HG (2014). Reptiles and Amphibians of Australia, Seventh Edition. Clayton, Victoria, Australia: CSIRO Publishing. xxx + 1,033 pp. .
Wilson S, Swan G (2013). A Complete Guide to Reptiles and Amphibians of Australia, Fourth Edition. Sydney: New Holland Publishers. 522 pp. .

External links

Skinks of Australia
Fraser Island
Taxa named by Patrick J. Couper
Taxa named by Jeanette Covacevich
Taxa named by Glenn Michael Shea